Takaji (written: , ,  or ) is a masculine Japanese given name. Notable people with the name include:

, Japanese footballer and manager
, Imperial Japanese Army officer
, Japanese swimmer
, Japanese general

See also
8907 Takaji, a main-belt asteroid

Japanese masculine given names